Aisa Kirabo Kacyira is a Rwandese diplomat who was Deputy Executive Director Assistant Secretary-General of the United Nations Human Settlements Programme from 2011 to 2018. In this capacity, she has played a significant role in developing sustainable cities and human settlements across the world, working closely with both governmental and non-governmental organizations She was formerly the Governor of the Eastern Province of Rwanda, and was the Mayor of Kigali from 2006 to 2011.

Career
Dr. Aisa Kirabo Kacyira graduated from James Cook University in Australia with a Master's degree in veterinary science in animal production and economics, after studying veterinary medicine at Makelele University in Uganda, who previously studied at the School of Banking and Property Management (SFB).

Awards 
In 2008, the city of Kigali received an award from UN HABITAT, which was received by Dr. Aisa Kirabo Kacyira, who was also the mayor of Kigali at the time.

Personal life
Kacyira is married and has four children.

References 

Rwanda and the United Nations
Living people
Year of birth missing (living people)
James Cook University alumni
Makerere University alumni
Rwandan diplomats
21st-century Rwandan women politicians
21st-century Rwandan politicians